The landscape of Ireland is dotted with many hillforts. These are classically defined as small hilltop settlements fortified with earthworks, but many are not located on hills, and probably did not function as forts. Their function is unclear; although conventionally interpreted as defensive fortifications and centres of economic political power, there is little evidence that they were ever attacked, and more recent scholarship has suggested that they may be better interpreted as monuments. Many of Ireland's hillforts are promontory forts on the coasts.

County Carlow 
Ballinkillin, contour fort
Killoughterane, contour fort

County Cavan 
Ardamagh, partial contour fort
Ballyhugh, promontory fort
Derryragh, contour fort
Drumacleeskin, contour fort
Garrysallagh (D'Arcy), promontory fort
Glasleck, promontory fort
Magherintemple, contour fort
Mullagh, promontory fort

County Clare 

Anneville, promontory fort
Ardcarney, contour fort
Ballard, promontory fort
Ballard, promontory fort
Ballybreen, contour fort
Ballyherragh, promontory fort
Ballyhickey, level terrain fort
Ballylan, promontory fort
Ballynahinch, contour fort
Ballyneillan, contour fort
Ballysheen More, hillslope fort
Breaffy South, promontory fort
Cahercalla, multiple enclosure hillfort
Caherhurley, contour fort
Caherrush, promontory fort
Cappanakilla, multiple enclosure hillfort
Carrownakilly, level terrain fort
Castlecrine, hillslope fort
Clenagh, contour fort
Cloghaunsavaun, promontory fort
Clonmoney West, level terrain fort
Cloonmunnia, level terrain fort
Corbally, promontory fort
Corbally, promontory fort
Crag, promontory fort
Emlagh, promontory fort
Enagh East, contour fort
Farrihy, promontory fort
Fintra Beg, promontory fort
Foohagh, promontory fort
Foymoyle Beg, multiple enclosure hillfort
Freaghcastle, promontory fort
Glennageer, hillslope fort
Keelderry, contour fort
Kilbaha North, promontory fort
Kilbaha South, promontory fort
Kilbaha South, promontory fort
Kilbaha South, promontory fort
Kilbaha South (Horse Island), promontory fort
Kilcloher, promontory fort
Kildrum, contour fort
Killard, promontory fort
Knockadoon, contour fort
Lislorkan North, promontory fort
Mooghaun, multiple enclosure hillfort
Moveen East, promontory fort
Moveen West, promontory fort
Mutton Island, promontory fort
Mutton Island, promontory fort
Quilty, hillfort
Rathclooney, contour fort
Tullagh Lower 1, contour fort
Tullagh Lower 2, hillslope fort
Tullig, promontory fort

County Cork 
Allihies, promontory fort
Ardaturrish More, promontory fort
Baile Iarthach Thuaidh (Ballyieragh North), promontory fort
Ballycotten, contour fort
Ballydivlin, promontory fort
Ballyieragh North (Clear Island), promontory fort
Ballymackean, promontory fort
Ballynacarriga, promontory fort
Ballyrobin South, promontory fort
Ballytransna, promontory fort
Billeragh, promontory fort
Caherdrinny, contour fort
Calf Island East, promontory fort
Canalough, promontory fort
Carn Tighernagh, multiple enclosure hillfort
Carrigillihy, promontory fort
Castlepoint, promontory fort
Castlewideham, promontory fort
Claragh, contour fort
Clashanimud, multiple enclosure hillfort
Cloddagh (Sherkin Island), promontory fort
Cloghfune, promontory fort
Cloghfune, promontory fort
Cloonaghlin West (Bear Island), promontory fort
Coolcoulaghta, promontory fort
Courtmacsherry, promontory fort
Curragh, level terrain fort
Derrycreeveen (Bear Island), promontory fort
Derryvreeveen (Bere Island), promontory fort
Donaghmore, promontory fort
Donneendermotmore, promontory fort
Donoure, promontory fort
Dooneen, promontory fort
Dooneenmacotter, promontory fort
Downeen, promontory fort
Downmacpatrick (Old Head), promontory fort
Drombrow, promontory fort
Dromclogh, promontory fort
Dunbeacon, promontory fort
Dunbogey, promontory fort
Dundeady, promontory fort
Dunlough, promontory fort
Dunnycove, promontory fort
Dunowen, promontory fort
Dunworly, promontory fort
Dunworly, promontory fort
Farranacoush, promontory fort
Garranes, promontory fort
Glenphuca, contour fort
Gortacrossig, promontory fort
Gouladoo, promontory fort
Greenane (Bear Island), promontory fort
Greenville, contour fort
Kilcatherine, promontory fort
Killeagh, promontory fort
Killoveenoge, promontory fort
Kinure, promontory fort
Knockdrum Stone Fort
Knockadoon (Warren), promontory fort
Lackavaun, promontory fort
Lahard, promontory fort
Lissamona/Lios Ó Móine (Clear Island), promontory fort
Lissamona/Lios Ó Móine (Clear Island), promontory fort
Loughane Beg, promontory fort
Moyross, promontory fort
Oldcourt, promontory fort
Portadoona, promontory fort
Rath, multiple enclosure hillfort
Reen, promontory fort
Reenadisert, promontory fort
Reenogrena, promontory fort
Rochestown, promontory fort
Slievemore (Sherkin Island), promontory fort

County Donegal 
An Bhraid Íochtarach, promontory fort
An Machaire, promontory fort
Balleeghan Lower, contour fort
Ballygorman, promontory fort
Ballygorman, promontory fort
Ballynakilly (Inch Island), promontory fort
Ballynarry, contour fort
Carrowmore, contour fort
Carthage, promontory fort
Carthage, promontory fort
Carthage, promontory fort
Crislaghmore, contour fort
Croaghross, promontory fort
Culoort, promontory fort
Derrylahan (Doire Leathan), promontory fort
Doon, promontory fort
Doonalt (Dún Alt), promontory fort
Drumacrin, promontory fort
Drumnasillagh, contour fort
Errarooey More (Oirear Dhumhaí Mór), promontory fort
Glasbolie, contour fort
Glengad, promontory fort
Gort an Choirce, promontory fort
Gortnatraw North (Gort Na Trá), promontory fort
Grianán of Aileach, multiple enclosure hillfort
Illion, promontory fort
Inishdooey (Oileán Dúiche), promontory fort
IR4350 Ballygorman, promontory fort
Knockfola (Cnoc Fola), promontory fort
Largysillagh, promontory fort
Linsfort, promontory fort
Maglin Beg (Málainn Bhig), promontory fort
Muckross, promontory fort
Muntermellan, promontory fort
Parkmore, promontory fort
Redford Glebe, contour fort
Reneely, promontory fort
Tory Island, promontory fort
Townparks, promontory fort
Tullynavinn, promontory fort

County Dublin 
Athgoe, contour fort
Dalkey Island, promontory fort
Drumanagh, promontory fort
Garristown, contour fort
Howth, promontory fort
Howth, contour fort
Knockbrack, contour fort
Lambay Island, promontory fort
Lambay Island, promontory fort
Rathmicheal, contour fort

County Galway 

Belmont, contour fort
Carrownderry, partial contour fort
Cloonamore (Cluana Mór), promontory fort
Clooncah, contour fort
Curragh (An Curragh), promontory fort
Dun Aengus, promontory fort
Earlspark, contour fort
Fahy (An Fhaiche), promontory fort
Fawnmore (An Fán Mór), promontory fort
Grannagh, contour fort
High Island (Ardoileán), promontory fort
Inishark (Inis Airc), promontory fort
Inishshark, promontory fort
Killeany (Cill Éinne), promontory fort
Kilskeagh, multiple enclosure hillfort
Knockacarrigeen, partial contour fort
Knocknacarragh, contour fort
Liathleitir, hillfort
Moanbaun, contour fort
Mullaghglass, promontory fort
Rahally, multiple enclosure hillfort
Westquarter (An Cheathrú Iartharach), promontory fort

County Kerry 
Alaghee/Alachaí Mór, promontory fort
Ballybunion, promontory fort
Ballyickeen Commons (Coimín Bhaile Ícín), promontory fort
Ballymacadoyle (Baile Mhic and Daill), promontory fort
Ballymore West (Baile Móir Thiar), promontory fort
Ballymore West (Baile Móir Thiar), promontory fort
Ballynahow (Baile na habha), promontory fort
Ballyoughteragh South (Baile Uachtarach Thiar), promontory fort
Barrow, promontory fort
Beal Middle, promontory fort
Bromore West, promontory fort
Caherconree, promontory fort
Clashmelcon, promontory fort
Clashmelcon, promontory fort
Cloghanecanuig (Clochán Ceannúigh), promontory fort
Coarha Beg, promontory fort
Cool East (An Chúil Thoir), promontory fort
Cool West (An Chúil Thiar), promontory fort
Coumeenoole North/Com Dhíneol Thuaidh, promontory fort
Doon East, promontory fort
Doon West, promontory fort
Doon West, promontory fort
Doonmanagh (Dún Meánach), promontory fort
Doonsheane (Dún Sián), promontory fort
Doonties Commons (Coimín nDúnta), promontory fort
Emlagh (An tImleach), promontory fort
Faha, promontory fort
Fahan/Fán (Dún Beg), promontory fort
Foilnageragh (Faill na gCaoireach), promontory fort
Glanbane, multiple enclosure hillfort
Kilfarnoge (Cill Fearnóg), promontory fort
Knockanacuig, contour fort
Knockglass More (An Cnoc Glas Mór), promontory fort
Meenogahane, promontory fort
Meenogahane, promontory fort
Minard West (Minn Aird Thiar), promontory fort
Minard West (Minn Aird Thiar), promontory fort
Murirrigane (Muragrán), promontory fort
Paddock, promontory fort
Reencaheragh (Rinn Chathrach), promontory fort
Reencaheragh (Rinn Chathrach), promontory fort
Tiduff (An Tigh Duibh), promontory fort
Tiduff (An Tigh Duibh), promontory fort

County Kildare 

Brewel West, contour fort
Dún Ailinne
Dunmurry West, partial contour fort
Hughstown, contour fort
Kill Hill, multiple enclosure hillfort

County Kilkenny 
Brandon Hill, hillslope fort
Clonmantagh, level terrain fort
Freestone Hill, partial contour fort
Toor More, multiple enclosure hillfort

County Laois 
Boley, contour fort
Capard, contour fort
Clopook, contour fort

County Leitrim 
Ballinwing, promontory fort
Boeeshil, contour fort
Fawnlion, promontory fort
Sheemore, contour fort
The Doons, multiple enclosure hillfort
Woodford Demesne, promontory fort

County Limerick 
Ballycahill, promontory fort
Ballylin, multiple enclosure hillfort
Castle Gale, promontory fort
Dunglara, hillslope fort
Friarstown 1, contour fort
Friarstown 2, contour fort
Knocknasnaa, multiple enclosure hillfort
Knockroe, contour fort
Knocksouna, multiple enclosure hillfort
Lisbane, multiple enclosure hillfort
Rathcannon, multiple enclosure hillfort
Tory Hill, contour fort

County Longford 
Granard, contour fort

County Louth 
Ballinteskin, promontory fort
Kane, promontory fort
Knockagh, promontory fort
Mountbagnall, promontory fort
Slieve, promontory fort

County Mayo 
Achadh Ghlaisín, promontory fort
Achill Beg, promontory fort
Achill Beg, promontory fort
Achill Beg Island, promontory fort
Aghadoon (Achadh Dúin), promontory fort
Aghaglasheen (Achadh Ghlaisín), promontory fort
Aghaglasheen (Achadh Ghlaisín), promontory fort
Annagh (An tEanach), promontory fort
Annagh (An tEanach), promontory fort
Annagh (An tEannach), promontory fort
Aughernagailliagh (Eoghair na gCaille), promontory fort
Aughernagalliagh (Eochair na gCailleach), promontory fort
Ballybroony, contour fort
Four at Ballyglass (An Baile Glas), promontory fort, promontory fort, promontory fort, promontory fort
Ballyheer (Inishturk), promontory fort
Ballymartin, level terrain fort
Two at Ballytoothy More (Clare Island), promontory fort, promontory fort
Four at Béal Deirg Mór, promontory fort, promontory fort, promontory fort, promontory fort
Brodullagh South, multiple enclosure hillfort
Carrowgarve (An Cheathrú Gharbh), promontory fort
Carrownaglogh (Ceathrú na gCloch), promontory fort
Castlecarra, promontory fort
Ceathrú na gCloch, promontory fort
Two at Cill Ghallagáin, contour fort, promontory fort
Claggan (Achill Island), promontory fort
Cloghans, promontory fort
Conach Réidh, promontory fort
Three at Dooega (Dumha Éige-Achill Island), promontory fort, promontory fort, promontory fort
Doogort East (Achill Island), promontory fort
Doogort East (Achill Island), promontory fort
Dooncarton, promontory fort
Doontrusk, promontory fort
Doorgort East (Achill Island), promontory fort
Duncarton, promontory fort
Duvillaun More, promontory fort
Errew, promontory fort
Two at Gladree (An Gileadraigh), promontory fort, promontory fort
Gleann Lasra, promontory fort
Gleannlasra, promontory fort
Glen (Clare Island), promontory fort
Glenlara (Gleann Lára), promontory fort
Gortbrack, promontory fort
Horse Island, promontory fort
Iniskea South, promontory fort
Kilgalligan (Cill Ghallagáin), promontory fort
Kinnadoohy, promontory fort
Two at Knockaun, promontory fort, promontory fort
Knocknalina (Cnocán na Líne), promontory fort
Laghtmurragha (Leacht Mhurchaidh), promontory fort
Lecarrow (Clare Island), promontory fort
Letter Beg (Leitir Beag), promontory fort
Pig Island, promontory fort
Pollacappul (Poll an Chapaill), promontory fort
Port Durlainne, promontory fort
Srahataggle (Sraith an tSeagail), promontory fort
Strake (Clare Island), promontory fort
Strake (Clare Island), promontory fort
Two at Termoncarragh (Tearmann Caithreach), promontory fort, promontory fort
Treanbeg, promontory fort
Uggool, promontory fort

County Meath 
Carrickspringan, promontory fort
Commons of Lloyds, multiple enclosure hillfort
Kilriffin, contour fort
Knowth, promontory fort
Mountfortesque, partial contour fort
Ringlestown, contour fort

County Monaghan 
Raferagh, contour fort

County Offaly 
Ballycurragh, multiple enclosure hillfort
Ballykilleen, contour fort
Ballymacmurragh, contour fort
Cumber Lower, multiple enclosure hillfort
Killowen, partial contour fort
Togher, contour fort

County Roscommon 
Annagh, promontory fort
Ballymore, promontory fort
Beagh, promontory fort
Carrowgarve, contour fort
Carrowkeel, level terrain fort
Carrowkeel, contour fort
Castleruby, hillslope fort
Castletenison Demesne, promontory fort
Churchacres, promontory fort
Dundermot, promontory fort
Greaghnaglogh, promontory fort
Killeenadeema, hillslope fort
Moydow, contour fort
Mullaghnashee, contour fort
Rockville, partial contour fort
Shankoagh, promontory fort
Sroove, contour fort
Warren, promontory fort

County Sligo 
Ballyconnell, promontory fort
Carrowgilhooly, level terrain fort
Carrowmoran, promontory fort
Carrowmoran, promontory fort
Carrownrush, multiple enclosure hillfort
Carrownrush, promontory fort
Carrownrush, promontory fort
Clogher Beg, promontory fort
Donaghintraine, promontory fort
Drumnagranshy, partial contour fort
Hazelwood Demesne, promontory fort
Kilkillogue, promontory fort
Kncoklane, promontory fort
Knocknashee, multiple enclosure hillfort
Knoxspark, promontory fort
Lahanagh, promontory fort
Muckelty, contour fort
Mullaghcor, contour fort
Mullaghmore, promontory fort

County Tipperary 
Ahenny, contour fort
Ballincurra, contour fort
Ballynamrossagh, contour fort
Ballyneety, contour fort
Curraghadobbin, multiple enclosure hillfort
Farranshea, contour fort
Garrangrena Lower, contour fort
Kedrah, contour fort
Kilbragh, multiple enclosure hillfort
Knigh, multiple enclosure hillfort
Knockadigeen, contour fort
Laghtea, contour fort
Liss, multiple enclosure hillfort
Newpark 2, contour fort
Windmill, contour fort

County Waterford 
Annestown, promontory fort
Ballynaharda, promontory fort
Ballynamona Lower, promontory fort
Ballynarrid, promontory fort
Ballynarrid, promontory fort
Ballyvoony, promontory fort
Carrickahilla, partial contour fort
Cluttahina, multiple enclosure hillfort
Coolum, promontory fort
Dunbrattin, promontory fort
Dunbrattin, promontory fort
Dunmore (Shanooan), promontory fort
Garrarus, promontory fort
Islandhubbock, promontory fort
Islandikane East/Islandikane South, promontory fort
Kilfarrasy, promontory fort
Kilnamack East, contour fort
Knockatrellane, contour fort
Knockmahon, promontory fort
Lissard, contour fort
Rathmoylan, promontory fort
Shanakill, contour fort
Stradballymore, promontory fort
West-town, promontory fort
Woodstown, promontory fort

County Westmeath 
Bigwood, contour fort

County Wexford 
Ballybuckley, contour fort
Ballyhoge, promontory fort
Courthoyle New, contour fort
Glen (Richards), promontory fort
Nook, promontory fort
Ramstown, promontory fort
Saltee Island Great, promontory fort
Templetown, promontory fort

County Wicklow 

Brusselstown Ring, multiple enclosure hillfort
Coolagad, contour fort
Downshill, partial contour fort
Kilcashel, hillslope fort
Kilpoole Upper, promontory fort
Kilranlagh, contour fort
Knockeen, multiple enclosure hillfort
Oldcourt, contour fort
Rathcoran, multiple enclosure hillfort
Rathgall Hillfort, multiple enclosure hillfort
Rathmoon, multiple enclosure hillfort
Rathnagree, multiple enclosure hillfort
Spinans Hill 1, contour fort
Spinans Hill 2, contour fort
Sruhaun, contour fort
Tinoran, multiple enclosure hillfort

References 

List
Ireland
Hillforts
Hillforts